Järve (Estonian for "Lake") is a subdistrict in the district of Kristiine, Tallinn, the capital of Estonia. It has a population of 2,969.

Järve has a railway station on the Elron western route.

Gallery

References

Subdistricts of Tallinn